Hajji Bayram may refer to:

Places
 Hajji Bayram, Iran
 Bagaran, Armavir, Amenia

People
 Hacı Bayram-ı Veli, a Turkish Poet